Igerna flavocosta is a species of leafhopper from Madagascar.

References 

Insects described in 2013
Insects of Madagascar
Megophthalminae
Igerna flavocosta is a species of leaf hopper belonging to Madagascar.

Add more info!